Witaaspis was an extinct genus of osteostraci fish that lived in the Wenlock and Ludlow epochs of the Silurian period.

References 

Silurian jawless fish
Osteostraci genera
Fossils of Estonia